Juan Treviño de Guillamas (d. before 1636) was a Spanish governor of Spanish Florida (1613–1618) and Venezuela (1621–1623).

Biography 
Juan Treviño de Guillamas was born in Avilés, Asturias, Spain. The son of Francisco de Treviño and Ana Guillamás y Barriobueno, Treviño was appointed Captain General and governor of the Spanish province of La Florida in 1613. He moved to the provincial capital of St. Augustine, but resigned from office five years later on August 2, 1618. Juan de Treviño Guillamás was also governor of Venezuela between 1621 and 1623, and of the Isla Margarita.

Treviño died before 1636.

Personal life 
Juan Treviño y Guillamás married María Mercadillo and they had five children: Juan, Teresa, Francisco, Cristóbal and José de Treviño y Mercadillo. The first of them married Ana María Pacheco y Zabala on November 15, 1589 in Havana, Cuba. Teresa married Gonzalo Chacón de Narváez.

References 

Royal Governors of La Florida
Spanish colonial governors and administrators
Year of death unknown
Royal Governors of Venezuela
People from Avilés
Politicians from Asturias
Year of birth unknown